Gurusharan Sharma (born 15 January 1942) is a retired judge of Jharkhand High Court, Ranchi, India.

Early life
He was born in Pandarak in the Indian state of Bihar and hid father was late Giriwardari Sharma. He completed his schooling in 1956 from Punyark Vidya Mandir, Pandarak, and obtained a post-graduation degree in political science in 1963 from Patna University, Patna, and completed his Bachelor of Law from the same university in 1965.

Professional life
On 23 August 1966, he was enrolled as an advocate in the Bar Council of Bihar, and commenced his practice of law in Patna High Court, Patna.  On 19 October 1992, he was elevated to the position of a judge of Patna High Court. Subsequently, he was appointed a judge of Jharkhand High Court on 15 November 2000.

References

1942 births
Living people
20th-century Indian judges
Judges of the Jharkhand High Court
Judges of the Patna High Court